"Come Ye Blessed" is one of the two territorial songs of the British overseas territory of the Pitcairn Islands, the other being "We from Pitcairn Island". "Come Ye Blessed" is also the official territorial song of the Australian territory of Norfolk Island and is sung at most island events. It is also known as the "Pitcairn Anthem" in Norfolk Island, suggesting it may have been already in use and brought by Pitcairn Islanders upon their arrival in 1856.

The lyrics are taken from the Gospel of Matthew, chapter 25, verses 34–36 and 40. The music was composed by John Prindle Scott (1877–1932) and published in 1917. "God Save the King" remains the official national and royal anthem of the Pitcairn Islands and the official royal anthem of Norfolk Island.

Lyrics

References

External links
1917 published sheet music by John Prindle Scott.
Pitcairn Anthem: Come ye Blessed

Pitcairn Islands
Oceanian anthems
Gospel of Matthew
Year of song missing